Sione Latu (born February 23, 1971) is a former Tongan-born Japanese rugby player. He played as a number 8. He also played for Tonga and Japan XV. He is not related with fellow Japan national rugby union player Sinali Latu.

Career
His first cap for Japan was during a match against Hong Kong, at Seoul, on September 26, 1992. He was also part of the 1995 Rugby World Cup, where he played two matches, against Wales and Ireland. After the tournament, he retired. He also played for Sanyo.

Notes

External links

1971 births
Living people
Tongan rugby union players
Japanese rugby union players
Tongan emigrants to Japan
Naturalized citizens of Japan
Japan international rugby union players
Tongan expatriate rugby union players
Expatriate rugby union players in Japan
Tongan expatriate sportspeople in Japan
Saitama Wild Knights players
Rugby union number eights